Sophie Bould is a British theatre and TV actress, from Shropshire, where she attended Thomas Telford School and St Dominic's High School for Girls in Brewood. She is now based in London.

Her first stage appearance was as a little French girl, at age eight with the South Staffs Musical Theatre Company at the Grand Theatre in Wolverhampton. She has said: "It was from that performance that I knew I wanted to be an actress, it propelled me to take drama lessons and now I’m returning to that stage. It’s a strange but lovely feeling".

Bould graduated with a first class degree from Mountview Academy of Theatre Arts, having earlier attended the National Youth Theatre.

Her television appearances include Doctors, The Inspector Lynley Mysteries and Holby City.

Bould appeared in the West End at the London Palladium in the original Andrew Lloyd Webber production of The Sound of Music, alongside Connie Fisher. Bould played the eldest child of the Von Trapp family, "Liesl". She was also the understudy for "Maria" and received rave reviews in that role, having stepped in to cover an extended absence by Fisher through illness. Bould left The Sound of Music on 24 September 2007.

Bould appeared at the National Theatre on the South Bank in Coram Boy and enjoyed a season at Regent's Park, London. Her stage debut was as the lead in the Rodgers and Hammerstein version of Cinderella, at the Bristol Old Vic.

In 2008 she starred in the UK tour of Noises Off  and later that year as "Belle" at the Birmingham Repertory Theatre in A Christmas Carol until January 2010.

During the summer of 2010, Bould joined the companies of Sheridan's The Critic and Tom Stoppard's The Real Inspector Hound at Chichester Festival Theatre, playing to full houses and rave reviews. Most recently she took the leading role of "Lily" in The Secret Garden at Edinburgh Festival Theatre and the Royal Alexandra Theatre, Toronto, Canada.

She married Robin Savage in Shropshire in September 2010.

Bould starred as "Tracy Lord" in a UK tour of High Society in early 2013.

References 

1982 births
Living people
Actors from Shropshire
People educated at Thomas Telford School
People educated at St Dominic's Grammar School
National Youth Theatre members
Alumni of the Mountview Academy of Theatre Arts
English stage actresses